Cri Cri may refer to:

Cri-Cri (character), a fictional character, an anthropomorphic cricket
Cri-Cri (singer), stage name of Francisco Gabilondo Soler
Cri Cri (TV series), an Italian television series
Cri-cri (aircraft), redirects to a Colomban aircraft

See also 
CRI (disambiguation)